Scheidegger is a surname. Notable people with the surname include:

Casey Scheidegger (born 1988), Canadian curler
Fritz Scheidegger (1930–1967), Swiss sidecar racer
Mats Scheidegger (born 1963), Swiss musician and classical guitarist

Swiss-German surnames